Atethmia obscura is a moth of the family Noctuidae. It is found in Turkey.

Cuculliinae
Endemic fauna of Turkey
Moths described in 1933
Moths of Asia